Yann Thomas (born 16 April 1990) is a rugby union footballer, currently playing in the Gallagher Premiership for Bristol RFC.  He plays as a prop.

Thomas joined the Gloucester Rugby Academy from West Country rivals Bristol before the 2008–09 season and impressed enough to earn a senior deal.

Made his full senior debut for the club in the LV= Cup in 2009–10, and has also played as a dual-registered player for Moseley. On 2 April 2013, it was announced that Thomas had signed a two-year contract extension to keep him at Gloucester until the end of the 2014–15 season. On 25 April 2015, Thomas has agreed a new contract extension with Gloucester.

On 7 June 2017, after a nine-year stay with Gloucester, it was announced that Thomas has signed for third division French club Rouen in Federale 1 on a one-year contract, option for a further year. On 20 January 2018, Thomas moves back to England to join hometown club Bristol ahead of the 2018–19 season.

References

External links
Gloucester Rugby Profile

1990 births
Living people
Bristol Bears players
Gloucester Rugby players
Moseley Rugby Football Club players
English rugby union players
Rugby union players from Bristol
Rugby union props